Wekweètì (from the Dogrib language meaning "rock lakes"), officially the  Tłı̨chǫ Community Government of Wekweètì is a community in the North Slave Region of the Northwest Territories, Canada.
It has no year-round road access but does have a winter ice road connection; the majority of transportation to and from the community is through the Wekweètì Airport. Wekweètì is the closest community to the Ekati Diamond Mine on the border with Nunavut. Wekweètì is part of the Tlicho Government.

History
The area is within the traditional territory of the Tłı̨chǫ (Dogrib) First Nation and was a popular hunting camp prior to permanent settlement. In the 1960s, Dene elders around Behchokǫ̀ decided to return to the land and establish traditional camps in the bush. Wekweètì was established during this time, although in more recent years it too has become a modern community with essential services of its own. The community was formerly known as Snare Lake until 1 November 1998; prior to 4 August 2005 the community name used the spelling Wekweti.

Before 2005, the community was unincorporated, and local governance was provided by a First Nations band government, Dechi Laot'i First Nations. Under the terms of the Tłı̨chǫ Agreement, most responsibilities of Dechi Laot'i have been transferred to a new Wekweètì Community Government. However, Dechi Laot'i is still recognized by the federal government for Indian Act enrollment.

Demographics

The majority of the population are First Nations and languages are Dogrib and English.

Services
Alexis Arrowmaker School is Wekweètì's Elementary/Junior School and was rebuilt in 1994. The school is named after Alexis Arrowmaker, one of the signers of Treaty 11. The community has a store, Hozila Naedik'e General Store, a ten-bed hotel/lodge, Wekweeti Hotel/Snare Lake Lodge, a health centre, a community learning centre but no Royal Canadian Mounted Police detachment.

Climate 
Wekweeti has a subarctic climate (Dfc) with mild to warm summers with cool nights and long, severely cold winters.

See also
 List of municipalities in the Northwest Territories

References

Further reading

 Northwest Territories, and BHP Billiton Diamonds Inc. Communities and Diamonds Socio-Economic Impacts in the Communities of: Behchoko, Gameti, Whati, Wekweeti, Detah, Ndilo, Lutsel K'e, and Yellowknife : 2005 Annual Report of the Government of the Northwest Territories Under the BHP Billiton, Diavik and De Beers Socio-Economic Agreements. [Yellowknife]: Govt. of the Northwest Territories, 2006.

Communities in the North Slave Region
Tłı̨chǫ community governments in the Northwest Territories
Dene communities
Road-inaccessible communities of the Northwest Territories